The Arizona–Arizona State football rivalry (also known as the Duel in the Desert) is a college football rivalry between the University of Arizona Wildcats (UA) and the Arizona State University Sun Devils (ASU).

One of the longest football rivalries, the winner receives the Territorial Cup, created  for the 1899 champion between schools in Arizona and which the NCAA has certified as the oldest rivalry trophy in college football. Although the Territorial Cup did not change hands as a regular part of the competition until 2001, the rivalry between the two schools continued after 1899, a semi-regular event until becoming an annual event, uninterrupted, from 1946 onwards. In the entire history of the rivalry, the game has never been contested anywhere beside Tempe or Tucson, and alternates between the two respective campuses. Games in odd-numbered years are played in Tempe at ASU, and even-numbered years in Tucson at UA. It is part of the wider Arizona–Arizona State rivalry, which crosses 20 varsity intercollegiate sports.

History
The rivalry dates to 1899 in the Arizona Territory, when the University of Arizona in Tucson played the Normal School of Arizona of Tempe – which later evolved into Arizona State University – as part of the Arizona Territorial Football League Championship. (Arizona achieved statehood in 1912.)

The championship was a four-way series that also included Phoenix Union High School and Phoenix Indian School. Arizona and the Normal School met on November 30, 1899, for a Thanksgiving Day match at Carrillo Gardens in Tucson. Contemporary newspaper stories indicate that this was the first game for the University squad, while the Normal team was comparatively more experienced and better trained. The event drew 300 enthusiastic fans and was followed by a post-game Thanksgiving celebration for both teams hosted by the University. The "Normals", as they were called, won the game 11–2; as they had previously defeated the other schools, they were declared champions and received the Territorial Cup.

The two teams played each other sporadically for the next decades, and have played almost every year beginning in 1925 (when Arizona State became a four-year college). The rivalry became particularly heated in the late 1950s amid the political contention over turning Arizona State College into an official university, a change opposed by the University of Arizona and many of its alumni. In 1958, the year the measure was to be put to a statewide vote, Arizona State defeated Arizona 47–0. The blowout win was a major point of pride for Arizona State, which became a university later that year.

Another notably heated game came in 1968. The contest was expected to decide which team would go on to the Sun Bowl, but before the game, Arizona coach Darrell Mudra issued an ultimatum to the Sun Bowl committee that his team would not play in the bowl unless they were selected regardless of who won. The committee chose Arizona, who promptly lost to Arizona State 30–7 in what became known as the "Ultimatum Bowl"; Arizona proceeded to lose the 1968 Sun Bowl 34–10 to the Auburn Tigers. The events led to the creation of the Fiesta Bowl as a default bowl for Arizona State should they receive no other bids; it went on to become part of the highly lucrative Bowl Championship Series and is now part of the College Football Playoff system.

The rivalry series has been known for having decades being dominated by each team, with ASU having the advantage during the 1960s and 1970s, and UA dominating the early years, as well as the 1980s and 1990s.

In the modern era of the game, it has often been played on the day after Thanksgiving. It has most recently been scheduled for the Saturday after Thanksgiving to accommodate network television coverage. Starting with the 2009–2010 school year, both schools created a “Territorial Cup Series” that encompasses each of the 20 varsity intercollegiate sports that Arizona and Arizona State compete head to head in, apparently due to the schools believing that the rivalry happens in all sports and not only in football. Each sport is worth 1 point in the year-long competition. While the series has yet to have an official sponsor like other rivalry series between two universities, both UA and ASU have tracked down and promoted the series each season. The school that records the most points during the school year wins a trophy that is named after the Territorial Cup football trophy. If both schools finished tied, the winner from the previous year retains the trophy. As of the 2020–21 season, UA leads the series and is currently in possession of the trophy.

Rivalry name
The rivalry has had several nicknames, including the “Battle of Arizona”, the “Grand Canyon Rivalry” (not to be confused with the rivalry between Northern Arizona and Southern Utah that shares the same name), “Desert Wars” (due to Arizona being known for having a desert climate), the “Cactus War” (named after Arizona's prominent feature, the saguaro cactus), and the “Phoenix–Tucson rivalry” (due to both schools being located in state's two largest metropolitan areas, with ASU in Tempe, Phoenix's east suburb, and UA located within the Tucson city limits), with the most famous nickname for the rivalry being the “Duel in the Desert” (or the “Desert Duel”), since both schools wanted to battle for pride and to be the best team in the state, not only in football, but in all sports.

Territorial Cup

In 1899, and continuously since 2001, each year's winner receives the Territorial Cup, a traveling trophy. The trophy was originally used in 1899 for the series that involved the teams' first ever meeting. As the Normal School won all three of its games, it was declared champion and awarded the trophy. The cup's name refers to the fact that Arizona was a U.S. territory at the time; it, along with New Mexico, became a state in 1912.

After the tournament the trophy's whereabouts were unknown until 1980 when it was rediscovered in the basement of a church adjacent to Arizona State's campus. The cup was put on display in the Alumni Association headquarters and then the University Archives. It was later authenticated as the original cup by the NCAA, making it the oldest rivalry game trophy in college football.

In 2000, Arizona contacted Arizona State about displaying the cup on their campus. The following year, then ASU President Lattie Coor ordered that the Territorial Cup be shared as a traveling trophy, to be displayed by each year's winner. Coor and then UA President Peter Likins signed a protocol governing the cup's use and care. Each year the tradition is celebrated at a pre-game reception for boosters. A replica version was also made and is the trophy presented to the winner after the game.

The cup is silver plate over Britannia base metal and was manufactured by Reed & Barton of Taunton, Massachusetts. It was a standard style priced at $20 ($462.05 in 2010 dollars) in Reed and Barton's 1910 catalog. The inscription reads "Arizona Football League Championship 1899 Normal".

Series history
Arizona State University was previously known as the Normal School of Arizona (1899–1901), Tempe Normal School (1901–1925), Tempe State Teacher's College (1925–1928), Arizona State Teacher's College (1928–1945), and Arizona State College (1945–1958). Arizona State did not come under the control and patronage of the state's Board of Regents until 1945 and the teams did not play each other every year until 1946.

In the early part of the rivalry series, the games were played in Tucson due to the fact that ASU's home stadium held very few fans. In 1931, ASU hosted the game for the first time. Arizona dominated the early portion of the series, winning 20 of the first 22 meetings, by having more physical and better-trained players than ASU. The Sun Devils had a reign of dominance from 1949 to 1981, winning 24 of 29, including a 13–2 stretch from 1965 to 1979, under the leadership of ASU's legendary coach Frank Kush. The Wildcats got the best of ASU from 1982 to 1998, going 13–3–1, under the guidance of coaches Larry Smith and Dick Tomey and a dominant defensive unit that was one of the nation's best in the early 1990s. Since 1999, Arizona State currently has had the edge, winning 16 of the last 24.

In 2018, Arizona State mounted the biggest comeback in Territorial Cup history, as they overcame a 19-point fourth-quarter deficit to win, 41-40. In 2020, ASU embarrassed UA, 70-7, in a season affected by the COVID-19 pandemic. Arizona won the recent meeting in 2022 by a score of 38-35 to capture the Territorial Cup for the first time since 2016 and ended a five-game losing streak against Arizona State.

Game results

See also 
 Arizona–Arizona State men's basketball rivalry
 Arizona-Arizona State baseball rivalry
 List of NCAA college football rivalry games

References

College football rivalries in the United States
Arizona State Sun Devils football
Arizona Wildcats football
1899 establishments in Arizona Territory
Recurring sporting events established in 1899